The Half Moon Festival is an outdoor dance music (rave) event on the island of Ko Pha Ngan, Thailand held on the half moon, one week before and one week after the full moon. The promoters mainly employ local DJs using CD decks rather than vinyl. Various guest DJs play unannounced sets but the event does not book big name stars.

The Half Moon Festival complements the bigger Full Moon Party events. It is held in its own venue in a forest north of the Ban Tai village, between Thong Sala and Haad Rin.

See also
List of electronic music festivals

References

External links

Dance festivals in Thailand
Electronic music festivals in Thailand
Festivals in Thailand